Metal hydroxides are hydroxides of metals.  They are often strong bases. They consist of hydroxide anions and metallic cations.  Some metal hydroxides, such as alkali metal hydroxides, ionize completely when dissolved.  Certain metal hydroxides are weak electrolytes and dissolve only partially in aqueous solution.

Examples 
 Aluminium hydroxide
 Beryllium hydroxide
 Cobalt(II) hydroxide
 Copper(II) hydroxide
 Curium hydroxide
 Gold(III) hydroxide
 Iron(II) hydroxide
 Mercury(II) hydroxide
 Nickel(II) hydroxide
 Tin(II) hydroxide
 Uranyl hydroxide
 Zinc hydroxide
 Zirconium(IV) hydroxide
 Lithium hydroxide
 Rubidium hydroxide
 Cesium hydroxide
 Sodium hydroxide
 Potassium hydroxide

Alkali metal hydroxides

Other metal hydroxides 
 Gallium(III) hydroxide
 Lead(II) hydroxide
 Thallium(I) hydroxide
 Thallium(III) hydroxide

Role in soils 
In soils, it is assumed that larger amounts of natural phenols are released from decomposing plant litter rather than from throughfall in any natural plant community. Decomposition of dead plant material causes complex organic compounds to be slowly oxidized (lignin-like humus) or to break down into simpler forms (sugars and amino sugars, aliphatic and phenolic organic acids), which are further transformed into microbial biomass (microbial humus) or are reorganized, and further oxidized, into humic assemblages (fulvic and humic acids), which bind to clay minerals and metal hydroxides.

References 

Metals
Hydroxides